Jan Marini Alano is an actress and singer from the Philippines. She started her showbiz career in Ang TV, ABS-CBN's teen-oriented gag/variety show in the early 1990s. As one of the resident singers of the show, Jan honed her talents resulting in television appearances as a performer in various variety shows in the country. She released her eponymous debut album in 1995 with the single "Love Song" highlighting her soulful voice. She was included in the cast of the original soap Mula sa Puso as the lead's best friend. Her appearance in the series paved the way for Jan to play different roles in numerous drama series and specials of the two major networks. She has also appeared in several mainstream and indie films throughout her career. Jan has also performed live at music bars in the Metro. In late 2010, Jan released her sophomore entitled "Once" boasting 11-tracks of both revivals and originals, two of which were penned by Jan herself including the carrier single "White Walls." Her most recent regular appearance for TV was for ABS-CBN's "Pangako Sa'yo".

Jan is an advocate of natural and organic living, a fitness enthusiast and a homeschooling mom. She is also a blogger and an online influencer. Jan is a Christian. Jan is also running for councilor of District 4.

Personal life
Marini took a break from years of TV work and singing engagements to build a family with fellow actor Gerard Pizarras. The couple met on the set of the ABS-CBN TV series Mula Sa Puso, where they played an onscreen couple. After dating for three years, the couple married on May 7, 2000. Together they have two kids; Rian (born 2001) and Rain (born 2006).

Discography

Filmography

Movies

Television

Internet

References

External links
 

21st-century Filipino actresses
Living people
ABS-CBN personalities
Star Magic
1978 births
21st-century Filipino women singers